The Venezuelan pavilion houses Venezuela's national representation during the Venice Biennale arts festivals. It is located in the Giardini della Biennale.

Background

Organization and building 
The Biennale began in 1895. When it resumed after a break caused by World War II, Venezuela was invited to participate. The government of Marcos Pérez Jiménez agreed to fund a national pavilion, the first for a Latin American country. Designed by the Italian architect Carlo Scarpa, it was built between 1953 and 1956.

Representation by year

Art 

 1954 — Armando Reverón
 1956 — Mateo Manaure
 1958 — Régulo Pérez
 1960 — Hector Poleo
 1962 — Oswaldo Vigas
 1964 — Jesús Rafael Soto
 1970 — Carlos Cruz-Diez
 1978 — Luisa Richter
 1980 — Oswaldo Subero
 1988 — Jacobo Borges
 1990 — Julio Pacheco Rivas
 1995 — Meyer Vaisman
 1999 — Victor Lucena
 2005 — Santiago Pol (Commissioner: Vivian Rivas Gingerich)
 2007 — Antonio Briceño, Vincent & Feria (Commissioner: Zuleiva Vivas)
 2009 — Claudio Perna, Antonieta Sosa, Alejandro Otero
 2011 — Francisco Bassim, Clemencia Labin, Yoshi (Curator: Luis Hurtado)
 2013 — Colectivo de Artistas Urbanos Venezolanos (Curator: Juan Calzadilla)
 2015 — Argelia Bravo, Félix Molina (Flix) (Curator: Oscar Sotillo Meneses)
 2017 — Juan Calzadilla

References

Bibliography

Further reading 

 
 
 
 

National pavilions
Venezuelan contemporary art